Deutschlandsender Zeesen was a facility for longwave broadcasting near Zeesen, a  district of Königs Wusterhausen in Germany. Built by the German Reichspost in 1927, it served the nationwide Deutschlandsender radio transmissions by the Deutsche Welle broadcaster.

History
Construction started after the capacity of the first Königs Wusterhausen radio transmitter became insufficient to meet the growing demand. The station was inaugurated on 20 December 1927, then called Deutschlandsender II.

It was connected directly with the transmitter which was housed in a building in the middle of the two masts. Until 1928 Deutschlandsender II used the frequency 240 kHz. Afterwards its frequency was 183.5 kHz and, after 1934, 191 kHz. Its transmission power initially was 35 kilowatt; in 1931 it was increased to 60 kilowatt. 

A neighbouring short-wave transmitter was erected in 1931. Kurt von Böckmann, who for eight years had run the Bavarian network, was appointed in 1933 April to head the station.  In 1939, 250 people were employed operating ten transmitters, broadcasting a combined 70 hours of programming daily.  This overtook even the BBC. 

The short-wave radio sent propaganda to Great Britain, the Americas, and the Arabic speaking world.  

In 1939 the Zeesen transmitter was replaced by Deutschlandsender III at Herzberg. In World War II it was used as reserve transmitter for the Herzberg station and for transmitting messages to agents of German's secret services. The facility was not destroyed in World War II, however, it was dismantled in 1945 by order of the Soviet occupation forces.

See also
 List of transmission sites
 List of masts

References

External links
 
 http://www.skyscraperpage.com/diagrams/?b46815
 http://www.skyscraperpage.com/diagrams/?b46816

Radio masts and towers in Germany
1927 establishments in Germany
Towers completed in 1927
Buildings and structures demolished in 1945
History of telecommunications in Germany
1945 disestablishments in Germany